In mathematics, the multicomplex number systems  are defined inductively as follows: Let C0 be the real number system. For every  let in be a square root of −1, that is, an imaginary unit. Then . In the multicomplex number systems one also requires that  (commutativity).

Each  forms a Banach algebra. G. Bayley Price has written about the function theory of multicomplex systems, providing details for the bicomplex system 

The multicomplex number systems are not to be confused with Clifford numbers (elements of a Clifford algebra), since Clifford's square roots of −1 anti-commute ( when  for Clifford). 

With respect to subalgebra , k = 0, 1, ..., the multicomplex system  is of dimension  over

References
 G. Baley Price (1991) An Introduction to Multicomplex Spaces and Functions, Marcel Dekker.
 Corrado Segre (1892) "The real representation of complex elements and hyperalgebraic entities" (Italian), Mathematische Annalen 40:413–67 (see especially pages 455–67).

Hypercomplex numbers